Murvarid may refer to:
Operation Murvarid
Murvarid Palace
Murvarid, Khuzestan
Murvarid, Kurdistan
Murvarid, Markazi
Murvarid, Zanjan
Hasanali Morvarid
Mohammed Taqi Morvarid